José Alfredo Díaz Mendoza (September 25, 1949 – April 17, 1989) was a Mexican Luchador enmascarado (masked professional wrestler), better known by his ring name, Villano II (Villano Segundo). Despite being numbered "II" he was the oldest of the Díaz Mendoza boys and was thus the oldest son of Luchador Ray Mendoza.. His younger brothers wrestled or wrestle as Villano I (José de Jesús), Villano III (Arturo), Villano V (Raymundo), and Villano IV (Tomás). Villano II has at times been called "the Forgotten Villano" as he is the Villano who achieved the least success in the ring and only wrestled a sporadic schedule for the latter part of his career.

Professional wrestling career
José Alfredo Díaz Mendoza, called Alfredo for short, was the oldest son of luchador Ray Mendoza and grew up watching his father compete as a very successful Light Heavyweight. When he and his one-year younger brother José de Jesús were old enough they began training to be wrestlers themselves. Mendoza insisted that both brothers should get a college education to fall back on in case wrestling failed. As Rey Mendoza was still very much in demand all over Mexico, and as a result travelled a lot, Bobby Bonales completed most of the Díaz' training. Both Alfredo and José de Jesús made their professional wrestling debut in 1969, reportedly with their father initially unaware, and began working as a tag team known as "Los Bestia Negras" ("The Black Beasts"), with José de Jesús working as Bestia Negra I and Alfredo as Bestia Negra II, even though he was older. Later on the team worked as Los Búfalo Salvaje ("The Wild Buffalos") again with José de Jesús as "I" and Alfredo as "II". In 1970 the brothers came up with new ring characters, "Los Villanos" ("The Villains"), and the name, along with a very distinctive "X" designed mask, stuck with them for the rest of their careers.

Villano I and II held the Distrito Federal Tag Team Championship at one point, although records are unclear on who they defeated for the belts. The brothers began working for Empresa Mexicana de Lucha Libre (EMLL), the same promotion for which their father worked. They were quickly joined by their younger brother Arturo, who became Villano III. Villano I and II won the Arena Coliseo Tag Team Championship in the early 1970s, but did not achieve much else while working for EMLL.

In 1975 Alfredo's father joined with wrestling promoter Francisco Flores and investor Benjamín Mora, Jr. to form a new wrestling promotion called Universal Wrestling Association in direct competition with EMLL. One of the reasons behind the split was that Mendoza felt EMLL were not giving his sons enough opportunities in the ring. All three of the Villanos followed their father to the newly formed UWA. While Villano III became a singles competitor and pushed as one of the top stars of the promotion, Villano I and Villano II continued to work as a tag team or as an occasional trio with their younger brother. Villano II began appearing less and less in the wrestling ring as the 1970s wore on, usually explained by the promoters that he was injured. By 1983 Alfredo's younger brothers had taken the names Villano IV and Villano V and became the regular partners of Villano I, leaving Villano II to work only on rare occasions.

Personal life
Alfredo Mendoza was the firstborn son of José Díaz Velazquez and Lupita Mendoza. His brothers, like himself all became wrestlers: José de Jesús (Villano I), Arturo (Villano III), Raymundo Mendoza, Jr. (Villano V) and Tomás (Villano IV). Lupita Mendoza died in 1986, his oldest brother José de Jesús died in 2001, and his father José Diaz died on April 16, 2003. Díaz was adamant that his sons get a good education instead of becoming wrestlers, wishing that they become lawyers or doctors as he wanted to spare them the physical suffering he experienced himself. Once he realized that his two oldest sons had begun wrestling under masks he agreed to train them and help their wrestling careers. He was also instrumental in training the rest of his sons, although he insisted they both get college degrees before they were allowed to begin wrestling. Since his youngest son Tomás finished his education first he became known as "Villano IV" while Raymundo, the second youngest son, became "Villano V".

Death
Alfredo Díaz died on April 17, 1989, the official cause of death at the time was that he died of injuries suffered in the ring. Later it was revealed that due to depression, he had committed suicide by hanging himself at his home in Naucalpan.

Championships and accomplishments
Empresa Mexicana de Lucha Libre
Arena Coliseo Tag Team Championship (1 time) – with Villano I
Mexican National Tag Team Championship (1 time) - with Villano I
Distrito Federal Tag Team Championship (1 time) – with Villano I
Other titles
Northern Mexico Middleweight Championship (1 time)

Luchas de Apuestas record

See also
 List of premature professional wrestling deaths

Footnotes

References

1949 births
1989 suicides
Masked wrestlers
Mexican male professional wrestlers
Suicides by hanging in Mexico
Professional wrestlers from Mexico City
20th-century professional wrestlers
Mexican National Tag Team Champions